Hamit Hasancan (1870–1943) was a Turkish economist and conservative politician, who was an early, key member of the Republican People's Party.

References 

1870 births
1943 deaths
Politicians from Istanbul
Republican People's Party (Turkey) politicians
20th-century Turkish politicians
Turkish economists